Nemani Nagusi (born 21 July 1988) is a Fiji rugby union player. His usual position is as a Flanker, and he currently plays for Fijian Drua in Super Rugby Pacific.

Early Life

Nagusa attended the prestigious all boys boarding school Ratu Kadavulevu School, where he helped them to reach the Deans Trophy secondary schools finals in 2007 . He played alongside Henry Seniloli, and Kini Murimurivalu in the final.

Club career

Fijian Drua 
On 21 January 2022 Nagusi was named as the inaugural captain of Fijian Drua.

References

External links
 

1988 births
Living people
Fijian rugby union players
Fiji international rugby union players
Rugby union flankers
Tasman rugby union players
Stade Aurillacois Cantal Auvergne players
Newcastle Falcons players
Fijian Drua players
Rugby union number eights